Duncan Watt (1943–2017) was an author and a newscaster and radio presenter. A household name in the 80s and 90s, Watt read the primetime news on Channel 5 for the then Singapore Broadcasting Corporation from 1980 to 1998 as well as presented classical music on Symphony 92.4FM for about 24 years until 2004. He was also known as the author of a series of young adult books.

Biography

T

Watt was diagnosed with liver cancer in June 2016. He died on 7 September 2017 at the age of 74.

Published works

The Wallace Boys series
1995: Skulduggery in the South Atlantic 
1993: Sands of the Skeleton Coast 
1991: Trouble in Tristan 
1996: Legacy of Lobengula
1992: Killers against Kariba 
1991: Kidnapped in the Kafue
1993: Crash in the Caprivi 
2010: Mischief in “The Mousetrap”
1995: Hostage in the Highlands
2010: Assignment in the Alps
2010: Traitors in the Tyrol 
2000: Rebels Across the Red Sea
2000: Rebels Across the Red Sea II: Nemesis of the Nefud
2001: Rebels Across the Red Sea III: The Terrorists of Tibesti  
2010: The Monks of Montafon 
2010: South from the Seychelles
1994: Treasure of the Tiger
1997: Sultan of the Sulu Sea
2000: Missing in the Mekong 
1996: Pagodas of Pahang

Other works

1970: Caprivi crash
1970: Kafue killers
1974: Hijacked in Borneo 
1976: Hijacked in Kalimantan

References

External links
 The late Duncan Watt on TCS Channel 5 - end of News 5 update (video)

1942 births
2017 deaths
Singaporean broadcast news analysts
Deaths from cancer in Singapore